Pepbi Bala is a village in Ladiz Rural District, in the Mirjaveh of Zahedan County, Sistan and Baluchestan Province, Iran. At the 2006 census, its population was 104, in 17 families.

References

Populated places in Zahedan County